The New York City Landmarks Preservation Commission (LPC), formed in 1965, is the New York City governmental commission that administers the city's Landmarks Preservation Law. Since its founding, it has designated over a thousand landmarks, classified into four categories: individual landmarks, interior landmarks, scenic landmarks, and historic districts.

The New York City borough of Manhattan consists of the main island of Manhattan; the neighborhood of Marble Hill, located on the North American mainland; and several smaller islands. The LPC has designated fifteen landmarks on four smaller islands in Manhattan, including two historic districts, twelve individual landmarks, and one interior landmark. These designations comprise two on Ellis Island, six on Governors Island, one on Liberty Island, and six on Roosevelt Island. The designations include the Statue of Liberty, a national monument, as well as numerous buildings that are all also on the National Register of Historic Places (NRHP).

Context 
The New York City borough of Manhattan contains numerous smaller islands in addition to the main island of Manhattan. Three of these islands, Ellis Island, Governors Island, and Liberty Island, are located in Upper New York Bay, though jurisdiction of Ellis Island is shared with neighboring Jersey City, New Jersey, and Liberty Island is an exclave of Manhattan within New Jersey. There are also several islands in the East River, including U Thant Island, Roosevelt Island, Mill Rock, and Randalls and Wards Islands, which are legally part of Manhattan.

The New York City Landmarks Preservation Commission (LPC) is the New York City governmental commission that administers the city's Landmarks Preservation Law. Formed in 1965, the commission administers four types of landmarks: individual landmarks, which consist of the exteriors of objects or structures; interior landmarks, which consist of the interiors of structures; scenic landmarks, which include city-owned "parks or other landscape features"; and historic districts, which consist of geographically cohesive collections of buildings with a distinct architectural style.  Some are also on the National Register of Historic Places (NRHP), a separate program administered by the National Park Service. , the LPC has designated 149 historic districts, 1,439 individual landmarks, 120 interior landmarks, and 11 scenic landmarks. 

The smaller islands in Manhattan contain two historic districts, twelve individual landmarks, and one interior landmark.  Both historic districts contain landmarks within them: the Ellis Island Historic District includes one interior landmark while the Governors Island Historic District contains five individual landmarks. , all twelve individual landmarks on Manhattan's smaller islands are on the NRHP; Ellis Island and the Statue of Liberty are also part of the Statue of Liberty National Monument, and all landmarks on Governors Island are also part of the Governors Island National Monument. In addition, the Statue of Liberty is a World Heritage Site designated by UNESCO, and both the Statue of Liberty and Ellis Island are on the New Jersey Register of Historic Places.

History
The LPC designated its first landmarks on smaller islands in Manhattan during 1967, when five buildings on Governors Island were given individual-landmark status. The LPC subsequently gave individual-landmark status to six buildings on Roosevelt Island in March 1976; the structures included a house, a lighthouse, a chapel, and three former hospitals. That September, the LPC also designated the Statue of Liberty as a city landmark. The LPC designated the entirety of Ellis Island as a historic district in 1993, although most of the island is in New Jersey. The interior of the registry room inside Ellis Island's main building was also designated at the same time. In 1997, the LPC designated  of Governors Island as a historic district, which included approximately 100 buildings. The designation overlays that of the five individual landmarks that had been previously designated. 

Despite the protections given by the LPC, some landmarks have fallen into decay after their designations. These landmarks have included the Octagon Tower, Blackwell House, and Smallpox Hospital on Roosevelt Island. The Octagon Tower was incorporated into an apartment complex in 2005 after the LPC approved the tower's renovation.

Historic districts

Individual landmarks
All of these individual landmarks are also listed on the NRHP.

Interior landmarks

See also 
 List of National Historic Landmarks in New York City
 National Register of Historic Places listings in Manhattan on islands

Notes

References 

 
Locally designated landmarks in the United States
Manhattan smaller islands
New York City Landmarks Preservation Commission